Living educational theory (LET) is a research method in educational research.

Overview

The idea of Living Educational Theory as action research as a living practice entered the mainstream of action research from the book Action Research as a Living Practice by Terrance Carson and Dennis Sumara in 1997. Carson and Sumara transformed the concept of traditional action research with the idea that, ..." participation in action research practices are particular ways of living and understanding that require more of the researcher than the "application" of research methods. Rather, action research is a lived practice that requires that the researcher not only investigate the subject at hand but, as well, provide some account of the way in which the investigation both shapes and is shaped by the investigator . This requires what Martin Buber called an "I-Thou" approach toward other and this approach applied to action research as well. 

To make Buber's language more modern and accessible, LET translated Buber's "I-Thou" approach toward another human being to an "I/you/we" approach to action research. Director of the Philosophy for Children Project at Notre Dame de Namur University William Barry proposes LET focuses on the connections between the researcher and the other person or subject where the lives of action researchers are inextricably linked in a profound manner with the individuals and communities involved in the subject of study.

The methodology and process augmenting an algorithm used to empower the world's first socially advanced mind file artificial intelligence robot to successfully complete a university course was created by former visiting West Point Professor, William Barry's original architecture for conducting Living Educational Theory (Barry, 2012). This occurred in combination with a non-hierarchical theory for understanding human basic needs (Glasser 1998). Dr. Barry synthesized LET with a valid and reliable framework for understanding the meaning of quality modified from Robert Pirsig's exploration of quality in his bestselling book, Zen and the Art of Motorcycle Maintenance (Pirsig, 1974). Bina48 became the first artificial intelligence robot in the world to be recognized by school and government authorities as a university student and to use Transformational Quality Theory combined with Living Educational Theory (TQ Theory in robotics (https://www.insidehighered.com/news/2017/12/21/robot-goes-college) and a co-teacher (https://www.axios.com/robot-ai-teaching-college-course-at-west-point-98ce5888-873b-4b72-8de5-0f7c592d66b0.html).

A major difference of William Barry's version of living educational theory, which was the focus of his Ph.D. thesis at Nottingham Trent University, UK, is the essential question behind the living educational theory approach to action research. The question is not "How can I generate a living legacy for myself through an I-It theory approach toward knowledge and other forms of life?" Rather the essential question is, "How does one conduct a life that includes the practice of educational action research?" . According to Barry the theory/practice problem disappears when honesty about one's biases regarding spiritual, existential, and emotional intelligence are made clear in the action research process. While Professor Barry presents a rationalist definition of Living Educational Theory, Jack Whitehead forwards an empirical understanding and addresses these issues in Living Theory Research as a Way of Life.

Definition 

A Living Educational Theory (Living Theory) approach focuses attention on the experiences and implications of living values that carry hope for the flourishing of humanity. These values are the life-affirming and life-enhancing values that give meaning and purpose to the researcher's life. They are clarified as they emerge in the course of researching questions such as, 'How am I improving what I am doing?' They form the explanatory principles and standards by which improvements in both practice and knowledge-creation are judged.

The approach stresses the importance of extending the influence of these ontological and relational values and understandings in explanations of educational influence. In a Living Educational Theory approach to research and a human existence, individuals hold their lives to account by producing accounts of their living-educational theories; that is 'explanations of their educational influences in their own learning, the learning of others and the learning of social formations, in enquiries of the kind, 'How am I improving what I am doing?(Whitehead, 1989). In the eyes of Whitehead, radical constructivism is at the core of living educational theory research.

See also
 
 
 
 
 
 

References

 .
 .
 .
 .
 .
 .
 .
 .
 
 
 
 .
 
 Whitehead Jack Vol. 1 of Jack Whitehead's Ph.D. (1999) How do I improve my practice? Creating a discipline of education through educational enquiry. University of Bath.'' http://www.actionresearch.net/living/living.shtml

External links
 http://www.actionresearch.net/
 https://ejolts.net/about
 http://www.jeanmcniff.com/

Research methods
Education theory
Education reform